The 2019–20 season was Linzer Athletik-Sport-Klub's 112th season in existence and the club's 3rd consecutive season in the top flight of Austrian football. In addition to the domestic league, LASK participated in this season's editions of the Austrian Cup, the UEFA Champions League and also participated in the UEFA Europa League.

Current squad

Out on loan

Pre-season and friendlies

Competitions

Overview

Bundesliga

Regular stage

Results summary

Results by round

Matches

Championship stage

Results summary

Results by round

Matches

Austrian Cup

UEFA Champions League

Third qualifying round

Play-off round

UEFA Europa League

Group stage

Knockout phase

Round of 32

Round of 16

Notes

References

External links

LASK seasons
LASK
LASK
LASK